The League of Gentlemen's Apocalypse is a 2005 disaster horror comedy film based on the British television series The League of Gentlemen. It is directed by Steve Bendelack at his directorial debut and written by the series' cast along with Jeremy Dyson. Starring Mark Gatiss, Steve Pemberton and Reece Shearsmith, who reprise their roles from the TV series, along with Michael Sheen, Victoria Wood, David Warner, Alan Morrissey, Bruno Langley, Bernard Hill, Simon Pegg and Peter Kay who appear in guest roles, the film follows the series' characters as they enter the real world and meet their creators while the setting, the fictional town of Royston Vasey, is facing a series of apocalyptic events.

It is a British-American venture produced by Film4 Productions, Tiger Aspect Films and Universal Pictures. The film was released on 3 June 2005 in the United Kingdom.

Plot

Jeremy Dyson proposes to the other members of The League of Gentlemen a new series in which everyone in Royston Vasey wakes up with a tail. The other writers are keen to move on to new projects instead. He is confronted by three characters from the series - Papa Lazarou, Edward and Tubbs - and tries to run but falls off a cliff.

At the church the vicar, Bernice Woodall, tells Pauline Campbell-Jones and Mr. Chinnery that there are signs of The Apocalypse occurring. Hilary Briss has escaped from prison and holds Herr Lipp hostage, using him to hijack a car driven by Geoff Tipps. Fleeing fireballs, Briss leads them through a door in the church crypt, emerging in the real town of Hadfield, Derbyshire, the setting for Royston Vasey in The League of Gentlemen television series.

With the situation explained to them by Lazarou and the Tattsyrups, Briss, Herr Lipp and Geoff Tipps travel to London. Lipp pretends to be his creator, Steve Pemberton, and goes to his home where he discovers Pemberton has been neglecting his family. Briss and Tipps read through The League of Gentlemen's new project, a historical horror called The King's Evil, while Briss chases after an escapee Pemberton and re-captures him. Returning to the hideout, Briss discovers that Tipps has written himself into The King's Evil as the hero. Lipp meanwhile has become deeply attached to Pemberton's family, in particular his children. He searches Pemberton's belongings for his notes.

Briss takes Pemberton to Hadfield, where Pemberton telephones Reece Shearsmith. Shearsmith thinks that Briss is playing a joke on him, so Briss comes to the phone. Shearsmith initially believes that Mark Gatiss is joining in on the "joke" when he opens a door and Gatiss is standing right in front of him. Shearsmith and Gatiss find and capture Herr Lipp, and they travel to Hadfield. They go back to Royston Vasey via the dimensional door and swap hostages, but Pemberton is killed by a stray gunshot. Dr Erasmus Pea, the villain of The King's Evil, tries to persuade Briss to leave Royston Vasey and join him, but Briss refuses. Pea kills his fellow characters and turns them into a gigantic homunculus, which Briss fights. Shearsmith and Gatiss climb up the wall of the church to escape but Shearsmith falls to his death.

Briss kills the monster but is stabbed in the back by Pea. Before dying he tells Tipps that he is the only one who can save Royston Vasey. Tipps fights Pea while Gatiss tries to return to the real world but is held at gunpoint by Lipp. Tipps kills Pea using part of the homunculus. In the church, Lipp says he will kill Gatiss. The other characters try to dissuade him, saying that once all the writers are dead, Royston Vasey will cease to exist and they will die. Lipp claims that they will in fact be better off, because as long as they're controlled by someone else they have no free will and can never change for the better. Tipps tells Lipp that because he saved the day and can therefore change, Lipp need not kill Gatiss. He persuades Lipp to hand him the gun, only for Tipps to accidentally fire it and kill Gatiss.

With all the writers now apparently dead, the residents of Royston Vasey prepare for the worst. Instead, everything calms down and The Apocalypse is averted. The characters realise they now have free will. Herr Lipp adopts some orphaned children, the vet, Mr Chinnery, finds a rabbit and is able to take care of it without killing it, and Bernice and Pauline become romantically involved. Tipps leaves the church, waving goodbye to Edward, Tubbs and Papa Lazarou. It appears that Royston Vasey can continue to exist independently of its dead creators. However, in a mid-credits scene, Dyson is revealed to be alive but in a coma after falling off the cliff. Everyone else in the world now has a tail.

Characters
Nearly all of the action involves the characters Herr Lipp, Hilary Briss and Geoff Tipps, played by Steve Pemberton, Mark Gatiss and Reece Shearsmith respectively. Other characters such as Mr Chinnery, Pauline Campbell-Jones, Mickey Michaels, Barbara Dixon, Reverend Bernice Woodall, Tubbs & Edward Tattsyrup and Papa Lazarou also feature. The actors also play themselves, as well as three other characters from their new project, a 17th-century gothic horror entitled The King's Evil. Visual effects are used to show several characters played by the same actor interacting at once. The fourth member of The League of Gentlemen, Jeremy Dyson, who is not an actor, is played by Michael Sheen.

Cast

 Mark Gatiss as himself / Matthew Chinnery / Hilary Briss / Mickey / Sir Nicholas Sheet-Lightning
 Steve Pemberton as himself / Tubbs / Pauline / Herr Lipp / Lemuel Blizzard
 Reece Shearsmith as himself / Edward / Papa Lazarou / Geoff / Bernice / Father Halfhearte / Red Devil
 Michael Sheen as Jeremy Dyson
 Emily Woof as Lindsay
 Danielle Tilley as Dahlia
 Bruno Langley as Damon
 Alan Morrissey as Johnny
 Liana O'Cleirigh as Claire
 Victoria Wood as Queen Mary II
 David Warner as Dr. Erasmus Pea
 Bernard Hill as King William III
 Simon Pegg as Peter Cow
 Peter Kay as Simon Pig
 Liam Cunningham as Director
 Rachel Rath (uncredited) as Homunculus

Reception
The film premiered to generally positive reviews, with review-aggregation website Rotten Tomatoes shows that 83% of critics gave the film a positive review, with an average of 6.8 out of 10, based on 8 reviews.

Soundtrack
Track listing
"Apocalypse Theme"- 1:47
"Little Brown Fish"- 3:45
"Leaving for London"- 1:03 
"Meteors"- 2:25
"Pig Funeral"- 0:52
"Storm Over Royston Vasey"- 1:21 
"Stripped Down Theme"- 0:57
"Have You Seen Me?"- 1:33
"Dr Pea"- 2:00 
"Into the Crypt"- 1:21
"An Humunculus"- 4:30 
"The Kings' Evil"- 1:55 
"Herr Lipp in the Attic"- 1:32  
"Herr Lipp Unmasked"- 2:21 
"Arise Sir Geoffrey"- 1:19
"Back in Royston Vasey"- 3:54
"Hilary Versus the Humunculus"- 3:09
"It's a Miracle"- 3:02
"End Titles"- 3:26
Soundtrack references:

References

External links
 
 

2005 films
2005 comedy horror films
2005 fantasy films
British comedy horror films
The League of Gentlemen
Films based on television series
Film4 Productions films
Universal Pictures films
Films about time travel
Apocalyptic films
Cultural depictions of William III of England
2005 comedy films
2000s English-language films
2000s British films